Fabry is a large lunar impact crater of the form termed a walled plain. It is located on the far side of the Moon, just beyond the northeastern limb. Parts of this area are sometimes brought into view by the effects of libration, but the terrain is seen from the edge and so not much in the way of detail can be observed.

This formation is of significant dimensions in its own right, but it overlies the northeast rim of an even larger basin named Harkhebi. To the west is the crater Vashakidze, and east of Fabry is the small Petrie. Northwards lies Swann.

The outer rim of Fabry is heavily worn and eroded, with notches from subsequent impacts. A pair of small craters, including Fabry H, lies along the eastern rim. Smaller craters lie along many parts of this remaining rim, most notably a small crater across the southern rim, and a short, hook-shaped valley cutting across the northwest rim. Only a few sections of the rim remain relatively intact, while the remainder is merely a ring of mountainous terrain.

Sections of the interior floor are relatively smooth and level, but the surface is rough and irregular in the northeast quadrant. There is a central peak formed from a long massif that covers nearly a quarter of the crater diameter from west to east. At the southeast end of this formation is a small crater, located just to the southeast of the midpoint. The remainder of the floor has been resurfaced, and now is marked only by tiny craterlets and the rough ground along the edge of the rim.

Ray material from the young crater Giordano Bruno to the south carries across the floor of Harkhebi, and lies in a few faint patches on the floor of Fabry. This is most notable in the southern part of the crater to the south of the small crater near the midpoint.

Prior to formal naming in 1970 by the IAU, this crater was known as Crater 45.

Satellite craters
By convention these features are identified on lunar maps by placing the letter on the side of the crater midpoint that is closest to Fabry.

References

 
 
 
 
 
 
 
 
 
 
 
 

Impact craters on the Moon